Norberto von Baumann (born 27 November 1964) is an Argentine cross-country skier. He competed in the men's 15 kilometre event at the 1984 Winter Olympics.

References

1964 births
Living people
Argentine male cross-country skiers
Olympic cross-country skiers of Argentina
Cross-country skiers at the 1984 Winter Olympics
Sportspeople from Bariloche